King of Burlesque is a 1936 musical film about a former burlesque producer played by Warner Baxter who moves into a legitimate theatre and does very well, until he marries a socialite. Sammy Lee received an Academy Award nomination for the now dead category of Best Dance Direction at the 8th Academy Awards. Today the film is best known for Fats Waller's rendition of "I've Got My Fingers Crossed".

Plot
Former burlesque producer moves into legitimate theatre and does well until he marries a socialite. After his divorce his former top singer returns from London to help out.

Cast

Warner Baxter as Kerry Bolton 
Alice Faye as Pat Doran 
Jack Oakie as Joe Cooney 
Mona Barrie as Rosalind Cleve 
Arline Judge as Connie 
Dixie Dunbar as Marie 
Gregory Ratoff as Kolpolpeck 
Herbert Mundin as English Impresario 
Fats Waller as Ben 
Nick Long Jr. as Anthony Lamb
Kenny Baker as Arthur
Charles Quigley as Stanley Drake 
Paxton Sisters as Specialty Dancers 
Al Shaw as Lew Henkle (as Shaw) 
Sam Lee as Gus Keefe (as Lee) 
Andrew Tombes as Slattery 
Shirley Deane as Phyllis Sears 
Harry 'Zoup' Welsh as  'Spud' La Rue (as Harry 'Zoop' Welch) 
Claudia Coleman as Belle Weaver
Ellen Lowe as Miss Meredith (as Ellen E. Lowe) 
Herbert Ashley as Jake - Bolton's Chauffeur 
Jerry Mandy as Frankie 
Keye Luke as Wong 
Gareth Joplin as Speedy - the Bootblack
Lynn Bari as Dancer (uncredited)
Cyril Ring as Auctioneer's Assistant (uncredited)
Marjorie Weaver as Dancer (uncredited)
Jane Wyman as Dancer (uncredited)

Remake

The film was remade in 1943 as Hello, Frisco, Hello.

References 

Green, Stanley (1999) Hollywood Musicals Year by Year (2nd ed.), pub. Hal Leonard Corporation  page 50

External links 
 
 

1936 films
1930s English-language films
20th Century Fox films
American black-and-white films
Burlesque
American dance films
Films directed by Sidney Lanfield
1936 musical films
1930s dance films
American musical films
1930s American films